Bhagawatipur may refer to:

Bhagawatipur, Janakpur, Nepal
Bhagawatipur, Sagarmatha, Nepal